Ernst Moritz Theodor Ziller (Ernestos Tsiller; 22 June 1837 – 4 November 1923) was a German-born university teacher and architect who later became a Greek national. In the late 19th and early 20th centuries, he was a major designer of royal and municipal buildings in Athens, Patras, and other Greek cities.

Biography
Ziller was born in the rural community of Serkowitz in the district of Radebeul in Saxony. After graduating from the Dresden Academy of Fine Arts in 1858, he went to work for Danish architect Theophilus Hansen. In 1861, Hansen sent him to Athens. In 1872 he was appointed a professor at the Royal School of Arts, now National Technical University of Athens.
He was married to a Greek wife, Sofia Doudou-Ziller. His daughter Iosifina Dimas-Ziller (1885-1965) was an impressionist painter.

In 1885, he designed a three-story mansion where his family resided until 1912. Now known as the Ziller mansion, the residence was later acquired by Greek banker Dionysios P. Loverdos (1878–1934). Ziller died in Athens and was buried at the First Cemetery of Athens.

List of buildings 

Below is a list of buildings designed by Ernst Ziller.

Athens 
 Andreas Syngros mansion (now Ministry of Foreign Affairs)
 Church of Saint Luke
 Hotels "Megas Alexandros" and "Bakeion", Omonoia Square
 Iliou Melathron (now Numismatic Museum of Athens)
 Melas Mansion
 National Chemistry Institute of Greece (at the University of Athens)
 National Theatre of Greece
 Old building of the Hellenic Military Academy
 Old headquarters building of the National Bank of Greece
 Peloponnese Railway Station
 Presidential Mansion
 Stathatos Mansion
 Thon mansion (destroyed during the Dekemvriana)
 Villa Atlantis
 Loverdo Museum (former Ziller mansion, Academy Street 58a)

Attica 
 Transfiguration of Jesus church in Vilia, West Attica
 Royal palace in Tatoi

Aigio 
 Archaeological Museum of Aigion (old Municipal market)
 Cathedral Church of Panagia Faneromeni
 Church of Esodia of Theotokos
 Church of St. Andrew

Argos 
 Municipal Market of Argos

Gytheio 
 City Hall of Gytheio
 Parthenagogeio (Girls School) of Gytheio

Patras 
 Apollon Theatre (Patras)
 Perivolaropoulos mansion

Piraeus 
 Metaxa Mansion

Pyrgos 
 Archaeological Museum of Pyrgos (old Municipal Market)
 Municipal Theater of Pyrgos
 Old City Hall
 Railway station of Pyrgos

Syros 
 Ermoupolis City Hall

Thessaloniki 
 Greek consulate in Thessaloniki (today the Museum for the Macedonian Struggle)
 Metropolitan Church of Saint Gregory Palamas
 Metropolis building
 Theageneio Hospital

Others 
 Archaeological Museum of Milos
 Court House of Tripoli 
 Church of Sainte Marina, Velo, Corinthia
 Metropolitan Theater of Zakynthos
 Railway station of Olympia
 Former City Hall of Kea
 Former Primary School of Kea (now town hall)
 Marble fountain of 1872 at Syntagma Square

Architectural supervision 
 Academy of Athens
 National Archaeological Museum of Athens
 National Library of Greece
 Panathinaiko Stadium, renovation

Gallery

References

Other sources

Friedbert Ficker (2003). Ernst Ziller – ein sächsischer Architekt und Bauforscher in Griechenland: Die Familie Ziller Taschenbuc. Allgäu: Der Kunstverlag Josef Fink. .

External links 
Ernst Ziller exhibit at National Gallery, 22/03/2010 - 15/10/2010 
Ziller-Loverdos” Residence, Athens, Greece

1837 births
1923 deaths
People from Radebeul
Academic staff of the National Technical University of Athens
19th-century German architects
20th-century German architects
Naturalized citizens of Greece
German emigrants to Greece
Burials at the First Cemetery of Athens